Michael Leonard Mancini (born 8 June 1955) is a English-American former professional soccer player who played as a forward in the American Soccer League and Major Indoor Soccer League.

Mancini played for the New York Apollo in 1978 and 1979. In 1978, he scored 17 goals in 23 games. He then played for the San Francisco Fog during the 1980-1981 Major Indoor Soccer League season. He then played for the Detroit Express in 1981.

Honours
Individual
 ASL top Scorer: 1978 (17 Goals) - Jointly held with Jose Neto & Jimmy Rolland

References

External links
 MISL stats

1955 births
Living people
American Soccer League (1933–1983) players
Detroit Express (1981–1983) players
Major Indoor Soccer League (1978–1992) players
New York Apollo players
San Francisco Fog (MISL) players
Hendon F.C. players
Leyton Orient F.C. players
English Football League players
Footballers from Hammersmith
British emigrants to the United States
Association football forwards
Association football midfielders
English footballers
English expatriate sportspeople in the United States
Expatriate soccer players in the United States
English expatriate footballers
English people of Italian descent